Pandoro  is a traditional Italian sweet bread, most popular around Christmas and New Year. Typically a Veronese product, pandoro is traditionally shaped like a frustum with an eight-pointed star section.

It is often served dusted with vanilla-scented icing sugar made to resemble the snowy peaks of the Italian Alps during Christmas.

History

Pandoro appeared in remote times, the product of the ancient art of breadmaking, as the name, pan d'oro (literally: 'golden bread'), suggests. Throughout the Middle Ages, white bread was consumed solely by the rich, while the common people could only afford black bread and, often, not even that. Sweet breads were reserved for nobility. Breads enriched with eggs, butter, and sugar or honey were served in the palaces and were known as royal bread or golden bread.

The desserts consumed in the 17th century were described in the book Suor Celeste Galilei, Letters to Her Father, published by La Rosa of Turin, and they included "royal bread" made from flour, sugar, butter and eggs. However, the bread was already known and appreciated in the ancient Rome of Pliny the Elder, in the 1st century. That bread was made with "the finest flour combined with eggs, butter and oil". Virgil and Livy mentioned the preparation under the name Libum.

The first citation of a dessert clearly identified as pandoro dates to the 18th century. The dessert certainly figured in the cuisine of the Venetian aristocracy. Venice was the principal market for spices as late as the 18th century, as well as for the sugar that by then had replaced honey in European pastries and breads made from leavened dough. And it was at Verona, in Venetian territory, that the formula for making pandoro was developed and perfected, a process that required a century. The modern history of this dessert bread began at Verona on October 30, 1894, when Domenico Melegatti obtained a patent for a procedure to be applied in producing pandoro industrially.

See also
 Panettone, a similar Italian Christmas bread
 Colomba pasquale, a traditional Italian Easter bread

Further reading

External links
 Pan d'oro

Italian breads
Italian pastries
Christmas food
Christmas in Italy
Italian desserts
Cuisine of Veneto
Sweet breads
Yeast breads